Salacıoğlu (also named in full as Salacıoğlu Mustafa Celveti or Giritli Salacıoğlu Mustafa Celveti, sometimes with the title sheikh added) was a Turkish Cretan sufi poet of the late 18th century and early 19th century, author of one collection of poetry and of two mesnevis. He also used the pen names Salacızade and Salacıdedeoğlu.

Little is known on his life. He was born in Hanya some time before 1756, in which year his father, Sheikh Ahmed Efendi is known to have died, and he died in Kandiye in or some time after 1825, year which is recorded in a number of his late poetry. Through his poems, he is known to have travelled a lot and to have spent a few years in İstanbul, notably under the teaching of another renowned sufi of his time, Haşim Baba of Üsküdar.

Aside from his poetry in the Sufi tradition with a strong lyric touch, an important part of his verses were also intended to mark the foundation dates and other information related to public works (such as schools, fountains, other buildings) following the traditional method of ebced (abjad), a system of enumeration by letters of the Arabic script. His verses composed to correspond with significations according to the ebced system give valuable information on the Turkish society in Crete.

Poetry

Sources
 Poetry by Salacıoğlu by the Turkish Ministry of Culture in English, in French, in German

1756 births
1825 deaths
Divan poets from the Ottoman Empire
Sufi poets
Turkish-language poets
Cretan Turks
People from Chania
Cretan poets